Ben Griffiths (born 17 September 1991) is a former professional Australian rules footballer who played for the Richmond Football Club in the Australian Football League (AFL).

AFL career

He made his debut in Richmond's first win of the following year, against Port Adelaide in round 10 of the 2010 season.

Griffiths career was limited because of the number of times he was concussed during a game.

Transition to gridiron football

College career
Despite being contracted to Richmond until the end of the 2018 season, Griffiths retired from the AFL in January 2018 after receiving a scholarship with the University of Southern California to pursue a college football career as a punter and transitioning to playing American football.

Professional career
Griffiths was selected in the first round (9th overall) of the 2022 CFL Global Draft by the Edmonton Elks of the Canadian Football League.

Statistics
 Statistics are correct to the end of the 2017 season

|-
|- style="background-color: #EAEAEA"
! scope="row" style="text-align:center" | 2010
|style="text-align:center;"|
| 38 || 5 || 3 || 0 || 8 || 11 || 19 || 4 || 6 || 0.6 || 0.0 || 1.6 || 2.2 || 3.8 || 0.8 || 1.2
|-
! scope="row" style="text-align:center" | 2011
|style="text-align:center;"|
| 38 || 4 || 1 || 4 || 15 || 11 || 26 || 12 || 3 || 0.3 || 1.0 || 3.8 || 2.8 || 6.5 || 3.0 || 0.8
|-
|- style="background-color: #EAEAEA"
! scope="row" style="text-align:center" | 2012
|style="text-align:center;"|
| 24 || 9 || 0 || 0 || 41 || 42 || 83 || 21 || 9 || 0.0 || 0.0 || 4.6 || 4.7 || 9.2 || 2.3 || 1.0
|-
! scope="row" style="text-align:center" | 2013
|style="text-align:center;"|
| 24 || 1 || 0 || 0 || 3 || 3 || 6 || 3 || 2 || 0.0 || 0.0 || 3.0 || 3.0 || 6.0 || 3.0 || 2.0
|- style="background-color: #EAEAEA"
! scope="row" style="text-align:center" | 2014
|style="text-align:center;"|
| 24 || 16 || 12 || 15 || 101 || 43 || 144 || 71 || 44 || 0.8 || 0.9 || 6.3 || 2.7 || 9.0 || 4.4 || 2.8
|-
! scope="row" style="text-align:center" | 2015
|style="text-align:center;"|
| 24 || 13 || 12 || 14 || 85 || 41 || 126 || 59 || 23 || 0.9 || 1.1 || 6.5 || 3.2 || 9.7 || 4.5 || 1.8
|- style="background-color: #EAEAEA"
! scope="row" style="text-align:center" | 2016
|style="text-align:center;"|
| 24 || 13 || 14 || 10 || 83 || 56 || 139 || 61 ||36 || 1.1 || 0.8 || 6.4 || 4.3 || 10.7 || 4.7 || 2.8
|-
! scope="row" style="text-align:center" | 2017
|style="text-align:center;"|
| 24 || 2 || 0 || 1 || 10 || 5 || 15 || 8 || 6 || 0.0 || 0.5 || 5.0 || 2.5 || 7.5 || 4.0 || 3.0
|- class="sortbottom"
! colspan=3| Career
! 63
! 42
! 44
! 346
! 212
! 558
! 239
! 129
! 0.7
! 0.7
! 5.5
! 3.4
! 8.9
! 3.8
! 2.0
|}

References

External links

 

Ben Griffiths's statistics from Footy Wire

1991 births
Living people
Richmond Football Club players
Australian rules footballers from Victoria (Australia)
Eastern Ranges players
Coburg Football Club players
USC Trojans football players
Australian expatriate sportspeople in the United States
Australian players of American football